Carl Wilhelm Malkus Petersén (28 March 1884 – 3 October 1973) was a Swedish curler who won a silver medal at the 1924 Winter Olympics. He later moved to the United States and died in San Diego, California.

References

External links

1884 births
1973 deaths
Sportspeople from Stockholm
Swedish male curlers
Olympic curlers of Sweden
Olympic silver medalists for Sweden
Curlers at the 1924 Winter Olympics
Medalists at the 1924 Winter Olympics
Swedish curling champions
Swedish emigrants to the United States